The 2018–19 Andros Trophy was the twenty-ninth season of the Andros Trophy, a motor racing championship for automobile ice racing and motorcycle ice racing held in France and Andorra. The season began in Val Thorens on 8 December 2018 and finished on 9 February 2019 in the Stade de France stadium. Jean-Baptiste Dubourg was the defending Elite Pro Drivers' champion.

Teams and drivers

Elite Pro and Elite

Électrique
Every driver participates in an electric Andros Trophy car.

AMV Cup

Calendar and results

Notes
The AMV Cup Final and Super Final were always run on the last day of an event with Serre Chevalier and Super Besse being exceptions, where the first Final and Super Final were run on the first day and the second Final and Super Final were run on the last day.

Championship standings

Points systems
Elite Pro/Elite
Points were awarded for both the two Qualifying sessions, Super Pole and the Super Final. Only the best result of both Qualifying sessions counted. The best time of a driver decided the classification in case of a tie break. For example if Driver A became first in Q1 and eighth in Q2 and Driver B became second in Q1 and first in Q2, but Driver A set the best time, then A would receive the most points. The sum of the points received after Qualifying and Super Pole decided the starting grid for the Super Final. There was no Super Pole in the Elite championship. Points were awarded based on the results as shown in the chart below.At all events the Elite Pro field was split up into two groups. The top eight drivers after Qualifying (and Super Pole) raced in a normal Super Final and the other drivers raced in a Final. Because eight drivers raced in the Super Final, the winner of the Final was classified as ninth.Drivers who entered the Stade de France round, which was not part of the regular championship, scored 100 points.

Électrique
The Électrique championship had the same scoring system as the Elite Pro and Elite championships, but with different number of points and the Super Final was called a Final. Also in contrast to the Elite Pro championship, there was no Super Pole.

AMV Cup
Points are awarded based on finishing positions of the Final and Super Final as shown in the chart below.

Points dropped
In the Elite Pro, Elite and Électrique championships each driver's two lowest-scoring rounds were dropped from their total.

Drivers' championships

Elite Pro
(key) Bold – Pole position Italics – Fastest lap in (Super) Final (parentheses) – Round dropped from total

Notes
‡ – Non-championship round.
 Positions under 'Q' indicate the classification after Qualifying, but before Super Pole. 1 2 3 4 5 6 7 refers to the classification of the drivers after Super Pole.

Elite

Électrique

Notes
‡ – Non-championship round.

AMV Cup

Notes
‡ – Non-championship round.

Teams' championship

Notes

References

External links

Andros Trophy
Andros Trophy
Andros Trophy
Andros Trophy